The Royal Thai Army or RTA is the army of Thailand and the oldest and largest branch of the Royal Thai Armed Forces.

History

Origin
The Royal Thai Army is responsible for protecting the kingdom's sovereignty. The army was formed in 1874, partly as a response to new security threats following the 1855 Bowring Treaty with Britain, which opened the country for international trade.

Current
In modern era, the army has a long history of coups d'état and coup attempts. Its leadership continues to see coup-making as one role of the army.

On 22 May 2014 the army deposed the government, appointed military officers to the national assembly, and on 21 August 2014 they elected the army's Commander in Chief, General Prayut Chan-o-cha, as prime minister. The general retired October 2014 to concentrate on political reform which he said would take at least a year, following which he promised national elections would be held.

The existence of an information warfare unit participating in a cyber campaign against government critics was leaked to the public in late February 2020.
In 2020 Twitter shut down a network of accounts which were engaged in information warfare. According to Twitter “Our investigation uncovered a network of accounts partaking in information operations that we can reliably link to the Royal Thai Army (RTA).” The operation had targeted the political opposition within Thailand. The Thai Army denied that they had been involved in the disinformation operation.

Army components and control

The number of army generals is unclear. One point of comparison: as of 1 November 2019, the US Army had 322 general officers for a force of 471,990 troops. Saiyud Kerdphol is Thailand's oldest general, a veteran of World War II and Korea who retired in 1983 as supreme commander. During his tenure, general officer numbers were based on the number of troops under their command. , only 150–200 four-star generals occupy command positions. Speaking on the topic of army manpower, Saiyud declared that, "Everybody being a general is unbelievable. Full generals don't have a seat to sit in or a job to do."

Command and control
The commanders-in-chief of the Royal Thai Army (ผู้บัญชาการทหารบกไทย) is considered the most powerful position in the Royal Thai Armed Forces. As of 1 October 2020, the commander is General Narongpan Jitkaewthae.

 Commander-in-Chief: General Narongpan Jitkaewthae from 1 October 2020
 Deputy Commander-in-Chief: General Jaroenchai Hintao from 1 October 2022
 Chairman of the Royal Thai Army Advisory Board: General Phumipat Chansawang from 1 October 2022
 Assistant Commander-in-Chief: General Suksan Nongbualang from 1 October 2022
 Assistant Commander-in-Chief: General Kriangkrai Srirak from 1 October 2022
 Chief of Staff of the Army: General Ukrit Boontanon from 1 October 2022
 Commander of the 1st Army Area: Lieutenant General Pana Klaewblaudtuk from 1 October 2022
 Commander of the 2nd Army Area: Lieutenant General Sawarat Saengpol from 1 October 2021
 Commander of the 3rd Army Area: Lieutenant General Suriya Iamsuro from 1 October 2022
 Commander of the 4th Army Area: Lieutenant General Shanti Shakuntanak from 1 October 2022
 Commander of the Royal Thai Army Special Warfare Command: Lieutenant General Nattawut Nakanakorn from 1 October 2021

Structure
The army is organized nationally into four army areas:

 First Army Area - – headquartered in Bangkok, controls troops in 26 provinces in central, eastern, western Thailand and Bangkok.
 1st Division, King's Guard - (Bangkok)
 31st Infantry Regiment, King Bhumibol's Guard - 
 1st Infantry Battalion, 31st Infantry Regiment, King Bhumibol's Guard
 2nd Infantry Battalion, 31st Infantry Regiment, King Bhumibol's Guard
 3rd Infantry Battalion, 31st Infantry Regiment, King Bhumibol's Guard
 1st Field Artillery Regiment, King's Guard. -
 1st Field Artillery Battalion, 1st Field Artillery Regiment, King's Guard
 11th Field Artillery Battalion, 1st Field Artillery Regiment, King's Guard
 31st Field Artillery Battalion, 1st Field Artillery Regiment, King's Guard
 4th Tank Battalion 1st Division, King's Guard -
 1st Combat Engineer Battalion, King's Guard -
 1st Signal Battalion, King's Guard -
 1st Combat Medical Battalion, King's Guard -
 1st Long Range Reconnaissance Patrols Company -
 2nd Infantry Division, Queen's Guard - (Fort Phromyothi, Prachinburi Province)
 2nd Infantry Regiment, Queen Sirikit's Guard - - (aka "Burapha Payak")
 1st Infantry Battalion, Queen Sirikit's Guard
 2nd Infantry Battalion, Queen Sirikit's Guard
 3rd Infantry Battalion, Queen Sirikit's Guard
 12th Infantry Regiment, Queen Sirikit's Guard -
 1st Infantry Battalion, Queen Sirikit's Guard
 2nd Infantry Battalion, Queen Sirikit's Guard
 3rd Infantry Battalion, Queen Sirikit's Guard
 21st Infantry Regiment, Queen Sirikit's Guard - - (aka "Thahan Suea Rachini")
 1st Infantry Battalion, Queen Sirikit's Guard
 2nd Infantry Battalion, Queen Sirikit's Guard
 3rd Infantry Battalion, Queen Sirikit's Guard
 2nd Field Artillery Regiment, Queen Sirikit's Guard -
 2nd Field Artillery Battalion, Queen Sirikit's Guard
 12th Field Artillery Battalion, Queen Sirikit's Guard
 21st Field Artillery Battalion, Queen Sirikit's Guard
 102nd Field Artillery Battalion,Queen Sirikit's Guard
 Maintenance Battalion, 2nd Service Support Regiment -
 2nd Cavalry Squadron, Queen Sirikit's Guard -
 30th Cavalry Squadron, 2nd Infantry Division, Queen Sirikit's Guard-
 2nd Signal Corp Battalion, 2nd Infantry Division, Queen's Guard -
 2nd Combat Engineer Battalion, 2nd Infantry Division, Queen's Guard -
 2nd Medical Battalion, 2nd Infantry Division, Queen's Guard -
 2nd Anti-tank Company, 2nd Infantry Division, Queen's Guard -
 12th Military Police Battalion, 2nd Infantry Division, Queen's Guard -
 2nd Long Range Reconnaissance Patrols Company -
 9th Infantry Division - (Fort Surasi, Kanchanaburi Province) 
 9th Infantry Regiment -
 1st Infantry Battalion
 2nd Infantry Battalion
 3rd Infantry Battalion
 19th Infantry Regiment -
 1st Infantry Battalion
 2nd Infantry Battalion
 3rd Infantry Battalion
 29th Infantry Regiment -
 1st Infantry Battalion
 2nd Infantry Battalion
 3rd Infantry Battalion
 9th Field Artillery Regiment -
 9th Field Artillery Battalion
 19th Field Artillery Battalion
 109th Field Artillery Battalion
 9th Service Support Regiment  -
 Transportation Battalion -
 Maintenance Battalion -
 Combat Medical Battalion -
 19th Cavalry Squadron -
 9th Combat Engineer Battalion -
 9th Signal Corp Battalion -
 9th Long Range Reconnaissance Patrols Company -
 11th Infantry Division -  (Fort Somdet Phra Nangklao, Chachoengsao Province)
 111th Infantry Regiment -
 1st Infantry Battalion, 111th Infantry Regiment
 2nd Infantry Battalion, 111th Infantry Regiment
 3rd Infantry Battalion, 111th Infantry Regiment
 112nd Infantry Regiment -
 1st Infantry Battalion, 112th Infantry Regiment
 2nd Infantry Battalion, 112th Infantry Regiment
 3rd Infantry Battalion, 112th Infantry Regiment
 Maintenance Battalion, Service Support Regiment, 11th Infantry Division -
 2nd Cavalry Division, King's Guard - (Bangkok)
 27th Cavalry Squadron, King's Guard -
 29th Cavalry Squadron, King Bhumibol's Guard -
 1st Cavalry Regiment, King's Guard -
 1st Cavalry Squadron, 1st Cavalry Regiment, King's Guard -
 3rd Cavalry Squadron, 1st Cavalry Regiment, King's Guard -
 17th Cavalry Squadron, 1st Cavalry Regiment, King's Guard -
 4th Cavalry Regiment, King's Guard -
 5th Cavalry Squadron, 4th Cavalry Regiment, King's Guard -
 11th Cavalry Squadron, 4th Cavalry Regiment, King's Guard -
 25th Cavalry Squadron, 4th Cavalry Regiment, King's Guard -
 5th Cavalry Regiment,  King's Guard -
 20th Cavalry Squadron, 5th Cavalry Regiment, King's Guard -
 23rd Cavalry Squadron, 5th Cavalry Regiment, King's Guard -
 24th Cavalry Squadron, 5th Cavalry Regiment, King's Guard -
 12th Signal Corp Battalion -
 Logistic Battalion, 12th Service Support Regiment -
 1st Army Support Command -
 21st Logistic and Service Battalion -
 21st Maintenance Battalion -
 21st Ordnance Battalion -
 21st Signal Corp Battalion -
 1st Development Division -
 1st Development Regiment -
 1st Development Battalion -
 1st Combat Engineer Regiment, King's Guard -
 52nd Combat Engineer Battalion, King's Guard -
 112th Combat Engineer Battalion, King's Guard -
 Military District Commands -
 11th Military District -
 12th Military District -
 13th Military District-
 14th Military District-
 15th Military District -
 16th Military District -
 17th Military District -
 18th Military District-
 19th Military District -
 110th Military District -
 2nd Army Area – headquartered in Nakhon Ratchasima and is responsible for the northeastern quadrant.
 3rd Infantry Division - (Fort Suranari, Nakhon Ratchasima Province )
 3rd Infantry Regiment -
 1st Infantry Battalion
 2nd Infantry Battalion
 3rd Infantry Battalion
 8th Infantry Regiment -
 1st Infantry Battalion
 2nd Infantry Battalion
 3rd Infantry Battalion
 13th Infantry Regiment -
 1st Infantry Battalion
 2nd Infantry Battalion
 3rd Infantry Battalion
 3rd Field Artillery Regiment -
 3rd Field Artillery Battalion
 8th Field Artillery Battalion
 13th Field Artillery Battalion
 103rd Field Artillery Battalion
 3rd Reconnaissance Cavalry Company -
 3rd Combat Engineer Battalion -
 3rd Signal Corp Battalion -
 3rd Combat Medical Battalion -
 3rd Long Range Reconnaissance Patrols Company -
 6th Infantry Division - (Fort King Phutthayodfa Chulalok Maharat, Roi Et Province)
 6th Infantry Regiment -
 1st Infantry Battalion
 2nd Infantry Battalion
 3rd Infantry Battalion
 16th Infantry Regiment -
 1st Infantry Battalion
 2nd Infantry Battalion
 3rd Infantry Battalion
 23rd Infantry Regiment -
 1st Infantry Battalion
 2nd Infantry Battalion
 3rd Infantry Battalion
 6th Field Artillery Regiment -
 6th Field Artillery Battalion
 16th Field Artillery Battalion
 23rd Field Artillery Battalion
 106th Field Artillery Battalion
 6th Reconnaissance Cavalry Company -
 6th Combat Engineer Battalion -
 6th Signal Corp Battalion -
 6th Combat Medical Battalion -
 6th Long Range Reconnaissance Patrols Company -
 3rd Cavalry Division - (Fort Tinsulanonda, Khon Kaen Province)
 6th Cavalry Regiment -
 6th Cavalry Squadron, 6th Cavalry Regiment -
 21st Cavalry Squadron, 6th Cavalry Regiment -
 7th Cavalry Regiment -
 8th Cavalry Squadron, 7h Cavalry Regiment -
 14th Cavalry Squadron, 7th Cavalry Regiment -
 2nd Army Support Command -
 22nd Transportation Battalion -
 22nd Logistic and Service Battalion -
 22nd Maintenance Battalion -
 22nd Ordnance Battalion -
 22nd Signal Corp Battalion -
 22nd Combat Medical Battalion -
 2nd Development Division -
 2nd Development Regiment -
 2nd Development Battalion -
 2nd Combat Engineer Regiment -
 201st Combat Engineer Battalion -
 202nd Combat Engineer Battalion -
 Military Districts -
 21st Military District -
 22nd Military District -
 23rd Military District -
 24th Military District-
 25th Military District -
 26th Military District -
 27th Military District -
 28th Military District-
 29th Military District -
 210th Military District -
 3rd Army Area – headquartered in Phitsanulok, responsible for the northern and northwestern parts of the kingdom.
 4th Infantry Division - (Fort King Naresuan Maharat, Phitsanulok Province)
 4th Infantry Regiment -
 1st Infantry Battalion
 2nd Infantry Battalion
 3rd Infantry Battalion
 14th Infantry Regiment -
 1st Infantry Battalion
 2nd Infantry Battalion
 3rd Infantry Battalion
 4th Field Artillery Regiment -
 4th Field Artillery Battalion
 104th Field Artillery Battalion
 9th Cavalry Squadron -
 4th Reconnaissance Cavalry Company -
 4th Combat Engineer Battalion -
 4th Signal Corp Battalion -
 4th Combat Medical Battalion -
 4th Long Range Reconnaissance Patrols Company -
 7th Infantry Division - (Fort Chao Khun Nen, Chiang Mai Province )
 7th Infantry Regiment -
 1st Infantry Battalion
 2nd Infantry Battalion
 5th Infantry Battalion
 17th Infantry Regiment -
 2nd Infantry Battalion
 3rd Infantry Battalion
 4th Infantry Battalion
 7th Field Artillery Regiment -
 7th Field Artillery Battalion
 17th Field Artillery Battalion
 1st Cavalry Division - (Fort Phokhun Pha Mueang, Phetchabun Province)
 12th Cavalry Squadron, 1st Cavalry Division -
 2nd Cavalry Regiment - 
 7th Cavalry Squadron, 2nd Cavalry Regiment -
 10th Cavalry Squadron, 2nd Cavalry Regiment -
 15th Cavalry Squadron, 2nd Cavalry Regiment -
 3rd Cavalry Regiment -
 13th Cavalry Squadron, 3rd Cavalry Regiment -
 18th Cavalry Squadron, 3rd Cavalry Regiment -
 26th Cavalry Squadron, 3rd Cavalry Regiment -
 21st Field Artillery Regiment -
 20th Field Artillery Battalion
 30th Field Artillery Battalion
 8th Combat Engineer Battalion -
 11th Signal Corp Battalion -
 3rd Army Support Command -
 23rd Transportation Battalion -
 23rd Logistic and Service Battalion -
 23rd Maintenance Battalion -
 23rd Ordnance Battalion -
 23rd Signal Corp Battalion -
 23rd Combat Medical Battalion -
 3rd Development Division -
 3rd Development Regiment -
 3rd Development Battalion -
 3rd Combat Engineer Regiment -
 301st Combat Engineer Battalion -
 302nd Combat Engineer Battalion -
 Military Districts -
 31st Military District -
 32nd Military District -
 33rd Military District -
 34th Military District -
 35th Military District -
 36th Military District -
 37th Military District -
 38th Military District -
 39th Military District -
 310th Military District -
 4th Army Area – headquartered in Nakhon Si Thammarat, responsible for southern Thailand, it is the area that serves as the frontine command for those engaged in South Thailand insurgency. US State Department cables leaked by WikiLeaks in 2006 said: "Military forces totaling approximately 35,000 troops fall under the command of the 4th Army....the 5th Inf Div and the 15th Development Division (three regiments) totaling approximately 20,000 troops are the main units of the 4th Army."
 5th Infantry Division - – (Fort Thep Satri Srisunthorn, Nakhon Si Thammarat Province) 
 5th Infantry Regiment -
 1st Infantry Battalion
 2nd Infantry Battalion
 3rd Infantry Battalion
 15th Infantry Regiment -
 1st Infantry Battalion
 2nd Infantry Battalion
 3rd Infantry Battalion
 25th Infantry Regiment -
 1st Infantry Battalion
 2nd Infantry Battalion
 3rd Infantry Battalion
 5th Field Artillery Regiment -
 9th Field Artillery Battalion
 15th Field Artillery Battalion
 25th Field Artillery Battalion
 105th Field Artillery Battalion
 16th Cavalry Squadron -
 5th Reconnaissance Cavalry Company -
 5th Combat Engineer Battalion -
 5th Signal Corp Battalion -
 5th Combat Medical Battalion -
 5th Long Range Reconnaissance Patrols Company -
 15th Infantry Division - – (Fort Ingkhayutthaborihan, Pattani Province)
 151st Infantry Regiment -
 1st Infantry Battalion
 2nd Infantry Battalion
 3rd Infantry Battalion
 152nd Infantry Regiment -
 1st Infantry Battalion
 2nd Infantry Battalion
 3rd Infantry Battalion
 153rd Infantry Regiment -
 1st Infantry Battalion
 2nd Infantry Battalion
 3rd Infantry Battalion
 Service Support Regiment, 15th Infantry Division  -
 Transportation Battalion -
 Logistic and Service Battalion -
 Combat Medical Battalion -
 31st Cavalry Squadron -
 15th Combat Engineer Battalion -
 15th Signal Corp Battalion -
 15th Long Range Reconnaissance Patrols Company -
 4th Army Support Command -
 24th Logistic and Service Battalion -
 24th Maintenance Battalion -
 24th Ordnance Battalion -
 24th Transportation Battalion -
 24th Signal Corp Battalion -
 4th Development Division - – US State Department cables leaked by Wikileaks in 2006 said: "The Development Division is itself a traditionally 'static unit' that provides engineering, construction and other support to local communities in the South. It is not formally charged with security operations. Indeed, Development Division officers were very proud in stating that they have better relations with the locals than other security elements — and have not been attacked while engaged in construction or relief efforts."
 4th Development Regiment -
 4th Development Battalion -
 401st Combat Engineer Battalion -
 402nd Combat Engineer Battalion -
 Military Districts -
 41st Military District -
 42nd Military District -
 43rd Military District -
 44th Military District -
 45th Military District -
 46th Military District -
 Royal Thai Army Special Warfare Command also known as Royal Thai Army Special force – headquartered in Thale Chup Son, Mueang Lopburi, Lopburi
 1st Special Forces Division -
 1st Special Forces Regiment (Airborne) -
 2nd Special Forces Regiment (Airborne) -
 3rd Special Forces Regiment, King's Guard (Airborne) -
 Ranger Battalion, King's Guard also known as Royal Thai Army Ranger -
 Special Operation Battalion, King's Guard also known as Task Force 90 -
 4th Special Forces Regiment (Airborne) -
 5th Special Forces Regiment (Airborne) -

The creation of the 15th Infantry Division was announced in January 2005. Defence Minister, General Samphan Boonyanan, was quoted as saying that the new unit, dubbed the "Development Division", would not be a combat unit for fighting Islamic militants, but rather its main mission would be to assist local citizens and develop the region. The military will not ignore its general function of providing safety for the citizens of the region, he added. He said that troops for the new division would undergo training to give them a good understanding of local residents, the vast majority of whom are ethnic Malay Muslims. The division is in fact a transformation of the Pranburi-based 16th Infantry Division. It will now be headquartered at Fort Ingkhayutthaborihan in Pattani, complete with its battalions and companies of military police and communications and aviation personnel, he said. It will also have three separate infantry battalions, one each in Pattani, Yala, and Narathiwat. Each battalion will include three companies of medical, engineering, and psychological warfare personnel, he said. The government will allocate a budget of more than 18 billion baht for the division over the next four years.

The 15th Infantry Division is being established as a permanent force to handle security problems in the Deep South. The division is based in Pattani and is expected to have a combined force of around 10,000. The establishment of this new division, approved by the government in 2005, has yet to be completed. As of this writing, some 7,000 troops deployed in the Deep South are affiliated to this division." In 2012, two new combat formations had been approved by the thai government. The new 7th Infantry Division is based at Mae Rim, near Chiang Mai, and the new 3rd Cavalry Division is based at Khon Kaen.

Tactical units

The army is organised into the following formations:
 Nine infantry divisions (including 16 tank battalions)
 One armoured division
 Three cavalry divisions (light armoured divisions)
 One Special Warfare Command trained and equipped for small unit Special forces and airborne operations

The Army Tactical Level Advanced Simulation (ATLAS) is an interactive, distributed, constructive simulation used to conduct military Command Post Exercises (CPX). ATLAS displays a continuous terrain model, incorporates HLA 1516, and displays 1:250,000 and 1:50,000 maps and satellite imagery. ATLAS was developed between 2002 and 2005 through co-operation with the Army Command and General Staff College (CGSC).

Army Medical Department

 
Army Medical Department (AMED) belongs to the service segment of the Royal Thai Army. It is in charge of medical affairs, and providing medical care, both in the field and on base, training personnel in research and agriculture and supervising the other medical divisions within the Royal Thai Army.

AMED observed 111 years of service in January 2011, with 110 years of service having been honoured by issue of a series of commemorative stamps. AMED operates Phramongkutklao Hospital in Bangkok and Ananda Mahidol Hospital in Lopburi, along with smaller hospitals at each fort, as well as Phramongkutklao College of Medicine (PCM).

Air Division

Royal Thai Army Aviation Center (กองบินทหารบกไทย) belongs to the service segment of the Royal Thai Army Areas:

 Don Mueang International Airport (VTBD)
 Units include the VIP squadron, flying two Embraer ERJ-135LRs (serial number 1084/HS-AMP and serial number 1124), two Jetstream 41s (serial numbers 41060 and 41094), two Casa 212–300s (serial numbers 446 and 447), and two Beech 1900C-1s (serial numbers 0169 and 0170) and the 1st Infantry Battalion operating two Bell 206Bs (serial numbers 4422 and 4448), three Schweizer S-300Cs (serial numbers 1340, 1366 and 1367), and two Cessna U-17B FAC aircraft (serial numbers 1616 and 1617).
 Bang Khen (3 km south of Don Mueang)
 The Royal Squadron flies three Bell 212s and two Bell 412s (serial numbers 36332 and 36333). There is also a special transport unit flying around 10–12 Bell 212s and one or two Bell 206s.

 Fort Surasi (Kanchanaburi)
 The 9th Infantry Division operates two Bell 206Bs (the serial number of one is 4424), and two or three Schweizer S-300Cs. There is also a detachment of UH-1Hs from an Air Mobility Company based here.
 Fort Chakraphong (Prachinburi)
 The "2nd Infantry Division, Queen Sirikit's Guard", was operating two Bell 206Bs (serial numbers 4446 and 4361), three Schweizer S-300Cs (serial numbers 1343, 1344, and 1345), and two Maule MX-7s (one serial number known is 099) in 2004, however it is likely the Maule MX-7s may now not be operated by this unit now. A detachment of this unit (with, in 1998, one Bell 206 and one Maule MX-7) was operating from Watthana Nakhon (VTBW) near the Cambodian border.

 Phitsanulok Airport (VTPP)
 Loc 16 degrees 46'58.58N,100 degrees 16'44.84E elevation 154 feet/47 metres.
 Runway 14/32 length 9,843 x 148 feet (3,000 x 45 metres)
 Operating from here is the 4th Infantry Battalion with Bell 206Bs, Schweizer S-300Cs, Cessna U-17Bs, and Maule MX-7s.
 Fort Suranari (Khorat)
 The main flying unit here is the 3rd Infantry Battalion flying two Bell 206Bs (serial numbers 4396 and 4447), two Schweizer S-300Cs (serial numbers 1337 and 1339), and two Cessna U-17Bs (serial numbers 1454 and 1618).
 This field also hosts a detachment of up to three Bell 212 helicopters from one of the Air Mobility Companies.
 Fort Princess Srinagarindra (Lopburi), the main base complex of Royal Thai Army Aviation, including training, technical school, aircraft maintenance, and aircraft storage. The main airfield here is called Sa Pran Nak (VTBH).
 Loc 14 degrees 56'58.02N, 100 degrees 38'34.88E elevation 95 feet (29 metres).
 Runways 01/19 3,300 x 98 feet (1,006 x 30 metres) and 06/24 3,890 x 98 feet (1,186 x 30 metres)
 Operating units here include:
 Gong Bin Bau ( Light Aviation Company ) – operating Cessna U-17Bs, Cessna T-41s, and Searcher MKIIs
 Gong Bin Pee-ak Moon Tee Nung ( 1st Air Mobility Company ) – operating Bell UH-1Hs and Bell 212s
 Gong Bin Pee-ak Moon Tee Song ( 2nd Air Mobility Company ) – operating Bell UH-1Hs (US Excess Defense Articles Program) and Bell 212s
 Gong Bin Pee-ak Moon Tee Sam ( 3rd Air mobility Company ) – operating Bell UH-1Hs, Bell 206Bs, Bell AH-1F Huey Cobras (eight) and Bell 212s
 Gong Bin Pee-ak Moon Tee Gou (pasom) ( 9th Air Mobility Company ) [Mixed]) – operating Bell UH-1Hs (US Excess Defense Articles Program) and Sikorsky S-70-43 Black Hawks (six) with six more on order.
 Gong Bin Sanub-sanoon Tua Pai (General Support Aviation Battalion) – operating Boeing CH-47D Chinooks, Bell UH-1Hs, and Mil Mi-17V5s
 The army aviation centre is based here, which conducts conversion training for the army. Types operated are Cessna T-41Bs (ex-US army surplus), Maule MX-7s, and Schweizer S-300C piston trainer helicopters.
 The two former VIP Beechcraft 200 King Air aeroplanes (serial numbers 0342 and 1165), are also based here. Their present role is unknown. These aeroplanes were modified in the US in the late 1990s.
A separate airfield within the Lopburi complex (around 3 km south of Sa Pran Nak) houses the 5th Aircraft Maintenance Company. This unit is responsible for maintenance and storage of army aircraft and helicopters.
 The 5th Infantry Division operates the following aviation assets from a small airfield within the army reserve at Nakhon Si Thammarat (not at the airport): two Bell 206B-3s (serial numbers 4382 and 4427), three Schweizer TH-300Cs (serial numbers 1371, 1372, and 1373) and two Maule MX-7s (serial numbers 114 and 115). A detachment of helicopters can be found here from the Air Mobility Companies based at Lopburi.

Military districts 
The army is divided into districts, whereby the first digit of the district indicates the army (first, second, third or fourth) responsible for its supervision. The names of forts are from locations or influential figures in Thailand's history. These are as follows:

Budget
The RTA budget for FY2021 is 107,662 million baht, down from 112,815M baht in FY2020.

List of Military Engagements

 Burmese–Siamese wars
 Siamese–Vietnamese wars
 Anglo-Siamese War
 Siege of Bangkok
 First Anglo-Burmese War
 Haw wars
 Franco-Siamese War
 World War I
 Western Front
 Boworadet rebellion
 World War II
 Franco–Thai War
 Pacific War
 South-East Asian Theatre
 Burma Campaign
 Malayan Campaign
 Cold War
 Korean War
 Malayan Emergency
 Laotian Civil War
 Cambodian Civil War
 Vietnam War
 Communist insurgency in Thailand
 Communist insurgency in Malaysia
 Third Indochina War
 Indochina refugee crisis
 Cambodian–Vietnamese War
 Vietnamese border raids in Thailand
 Thai–Laotian Border War
 Persian Gulf War
 War on drugs
 Internal conflict in Myanmar
 2010–2012 Myanmar border clashes
 1999 East Timorese crisis
 International Force East Timor
 Global War on Terrorism
 Operation Enduring Freedom
 Iraq War 
 OEF - Afghanistan 
 OEF - Horn of Africa 
 Operation Pochentong
 Southern Insurgency
 United Nations peacekeeping
 United Nations Iraq–Kuwait Observation Mission
 United Nations Operation in Burundi
 United Nations Transitional Administration in East Timor
 United Nations–African Union Mission in Darfur
 United Nations Assistance Mission in Afghanistan
 United Nations Mission in Sudan
 Cambodian–Thai border stand-off
 Thai political crisis
 1933 Siamese coup d'état
 Siamese coup d'état of 1947
 Siamese coup d'état of 1948
 Army General Staff plot (1948)
 Silent Coup (1951)
 1973 Thai popular uprising
 1976 Thai coup d'état and 6 October massacre
 October 1977 Thai coup d'état
 1991 Thai coup d'état
 Black May (1992)
 2006 Thai coup d'état
 2009 Thai political unrest
 2010 Thai political protests
 2014 Thai coup d'état

Equipment

Rank structure

Businesses and infrastructure
The army owns more than 30 golf courses nationwide. The army also owns boxing stadium, 100 petrol stations, racecourses, hotels, retail and coffee shops, and radio and television airwaves (by one count, the armed forces have ownership in 537 radio and TV stations). In early 2020, the army entered an agreement with the Finance Ministry to turn over to the ministry the management of businesses unrelated to the army's mission. In a related move, army commander General Apirat Kongsompong decreed that retired generals must move out of army-owned housing to free space for serving officers. , about 100 retired generals and colonels inhabit army accommodations. Some ex-generals, like PM Prayut Chan-o-cha and deputy PM Prawit Wongsuwan were exempted immediately from eviction because of their "contribution to society". The Thai Defence Ministry position is that there is no law prohibiting retired officers from occupying military housing.

In January 2021, the RTA signed a memorandum of understanding with the Electricity Generating Authority of Thailand (EGAT) to study the feasibility of constructing solar farms on 4.5 million rai of army land to generate 30,000 megawatts of electricity. Following up, on 22 February 2021 a meeting was called by the President of Royal Thai Army Radio and Television Channel 5 with energy firms interested in winning a piece of what is projected to be a 600 billion baht project. The Energy Ministry was not represented at the meeting. Critics have questioned why the army is involved in energy procurement, in contravention of existing regulations, and why Thailand needs more electricity when it already has 59% reserve capacity and more capacity under construction.

Broadcasting

Radio and television channel list

Free-to-air TV
 TV5 HD1
 Channel 7 operated by Bangkok Broadcasting & Television Company Limited (BBTV)

Satellite TV
 TGN

Radio
 Royal Thai Army Radio Network, all 126 stations

See also
 Royal Thai Armed Forces Headquarters
 Royal Thai Army Radio and Television
 Border Patrol Police
 Thahan Phran
 Battle of Phou Pha Thi, (Northeastern Laos, March 1968) covert Border Patrol "volunteers"
 Thai–Laotian Border War
 Cambodian–Thai border dispute
 Chao Phraya Bodindecha
 Military history of Thailand
 Rajabhakti Park
 Special forces of Thailand

References

External links

 

 
1874 establishments in Siam
Military units and formations established in 1874

de:Thailändische Streitkräfte